Zarnitsa (All-Union Young Pioneer military sports game Zarnitsa) was a massive children's war game organized within the Young Pioneers organization. The game was an imitation of military actions (reconnaissance, battles, etc.) The word zarnitsa literally means "heat lightning".

The game's rules are based on capture the flag concept. Two teams each have a base with a flag on it. Their goal is to take over the opponent's flag and preserve their own. Every player has two shoulder straps that serve as health indicators and can be torn off by the opponents. Losing one indicates "wounded", losing two indicates "dead". The "wounded" players cannot run and should only walk. The "dead" players leave the game.

It was intended for schoolchildren of 4-7 classes (10-13) years. A similar game, Orlyonok (Орлёнок), was for older schoolchildren.

See also
 Capture the flag

References

Military education and training in the Soviet Union
Vladimir Lenin All-Union Pioneer Organization
Russian games
Soviet games